Catur Rintang (born 16 May 1988) is an Indonesian professional footballer who currently plays as a midfielder for Persijap Jepara in the Indonesia Super League.

Career

Persijap Jepara
He played since 2009 for Persijap Jepara.

External links
 
 Player profil at goal.com

1987 births
Living people
Indonesian footballers
Liga 1 (Indonesia) players
Persijap Jepara players
Association football midfielders